Goda Ravi (fl. 905/06–c. 943/44 AD) was a Chera Perumal king of medieval Kerala, south India. The Chola relations with the Chera Perumals were consolidated during the rule of Goda Ravi. Records mention a number of Kerala military personnel serving with Chola prince Rajaditya in the Tamil country. An inscription mentioning Goda Ravi from Nedumpuram Thali, Wadakkanchery is one of rare Chera Perumal inscriptions which give both the regnal year and another era (Kali Year) at the same time. 

Temple inscriptions dated in the regnal years (13th to 30th) of Goda Ravi were discovered from Iranikulam, Chokkur (Puthur village, near Koduvally), Nedumpuram Thali (Wadakkanchery), Avittathur, Triprangode, Porangattiri, Indianur (Kottakkal) and Thrippunithura. The records mention, among other things, Koyil and Ala-Koyil, Chera queens (Ravi Piratti and Cheraman Maha Devi), "senapathi" (chief of the royal militia), the so-called Agreement of Muzhikkulam, and the chieftains of Vembanadu (Alappuzha) and Valluvanadu (the later with the title "Rayira Ravar").  

Goda Ravi was formerly identified with king Vijayaraga of the Chera Perumal dynasty.

Coronation year 
Recent scholarship suggests that the Nedumpuram Thali (Wadakkanchery) committee met and accepted the land grant on the 17th regnal year of king Goda Ravi (while Jupiter was in Mithuna) and the currently available inscription was only commissioned at a later date (corresponding to Kali Year 4030).

Epigraphic records 

Note: Material: granite, script: Vattezhuthu with Grantha characters, and language: old Malayalam (unless otherwise stated)

References 

People of the Kodungallur Chera kingdom
9th-century Indian monarchs
10th-century Indian monarchs
Kodungallur Chera kings